Phaeomolis lineatus is a moth of the family Erebidae. It was first described by Herbert Druce in 1884. It measures 31-36mm in length. It is found across Central and North America in Panama, Costa Rica, Honduras, Belize, Nicaragua, and Mexico.

References

Phaegopterina
Moths described in 1884